Small Farmers' Party of Finland was a party for the farmers suffering the great depression in Finland. The party joined with two other parties in 1936 and became the Party of the Small Farmers' and the Rural People. The Small Farmers' Party of Finland was established 12 May 1929. Already earlier a magazine The Small Farmer of Finland had started its publication. The party was established earlier than planned as the parliament was reliesed in April 1929 and the new parliamentary elections were to be organised. The reason for this were constitutional. The Anti-Communistic laws of the protection of the republic would not have become valid without general elections and third hearing.

The Small Farmers' Party of Finland won its first parliamentary seat in 1930. This parliamentarian voted for the confirmation of the laws of the protection of the republic. Also the party demanded rooting out the Communist movement of Finland in 1930. Later some left-wing farmers joined the party and they were welcomed. Also some radical ideas encouraged to the critique against the party suspected of helping the Communists and Russians. However the underground movement of the Communist movement of Finland has not seemed to have influence on the activities of the party. The party had about 200 local organisations and only few of them were not registered as the registered societies because of the laws of the protection of the republic.

Since 1933 there was also another similar party, the People's Party (Kansanpuolue), which had a seat in the parliament of Finland and the parties negotiated on merger for a long time, which eventually happened in 1936. The new name of the party was Party of Smallholders and Rural People. The third parliamentarian movement which joined the new party was the Central Committee of Recession Committees. Its supporters had taken part in the general elections as Pulamiesten vaaliliitto.

Members of the Parliament of Finland

Heikki Niskanen
People's Party, 1 September 1933 - 31 August 1939, could not take part in the parliamentary sessions in 1933-1934 as was imprisoned for the mutiny
Small Farmers Party, 1 January 1939 - 19 June 1941 
served his term to end in the parliamentary group of Agrarian League, 20 June 1941 - 5 April 1945
Eino Rytinki
 Small Farmers' Party of Finland, 1 September 1933 - 31 December 1938
Small Farmers Party, 1 January 1939 - 19 June 1941 
served his term to end in the parliamentary group of Agrarian League, 20 June 1941 - 5 April 1945 and was later elected on the list of the Agrarian League 8 September 1949 - 21 July 1958

References

Political parties established in 1929
Nordic agrarian parties
Defunct agrarian political parties
Defunct political parties in Finland
1929 establishments in Finland
Political parties with year of disestablishment missing